Poll results for the Norwegian parliamentary elections that were held in Norway on 13–14 September 2009. The results are shown in chronological order, with the oldest poll at the top of the list and the newest poll at the bottom of the list.

Poll results

Average polling
The following table gives the average of 10 monthly opinion polls (9 before December 2008 - Synovate, Opinion, Gallup, Sentio BT, Sentio DN, Norstat NRK, Norstat VL, Response, In fact and, from December 2008, Norfakta).

The following table gives the average of poll results through the electoral campaign, the last six weeks before the election. The biggest surprise was the successful campaign of the Conservative Party, which saw a great increase in its poll results at the cost of the Progress Party, up until the election day.

NRK polling

References

Norway
2009